Catherine Davis Higgins is an American voice actress, singer and jazz pianist.

Career

Music career
Higgins earned a degree in music from Auburn University in 1991. She is a trained pianist who studied with the jazz artist Bob Richardson. She released the first jazz album by her own name The Tide is Low in 2002. The second jazz album is Stealing Freedom. She is also in a band called Upper Structure.

Voice acting career
Higgins's major voice roles have been in English-language adaptations of Japanese anime, and she is best known as the voice of Sakura Haruno in Naruto and Talho Yuuki in Eureka 7. She has also voiced CC in Code Geass and Saber in the original Fate/stay night. Between 2010 and 2013, Higgins voiced Tails in the video game series Sonic the Hedgehog. She also voices Kate, Stinky, and Lilly in the Alpha and Omega sequels. In 2014, Higgins was cast as Ami Mizuno / Sailor Mercury in the Viz English dub of Sailor Moon. She voiced Purah in The Legend of Zelda: Breath of the Wild and in Hyrule Warriors: Age of Calamity and Starla in Nick Jr.'s Blaze and the Monster Machines. She is the current voice of Princess Aurora since 2010, a Disney Princess character originally seen in Walt Disney’s Sleeping Beauty. She also played the voice of Frankie Stein in Monster High and Briar Beauty in Ever After High. She also starred as Barbie in Life in the Dreamhouse in 2012.

Filmography

Anime

Animation

Films

Video games

Discography

Studio albums
 The Solid Rock (Concord, 1998)
 Bigger than Love (Concord, 2006)
 Jazz Standards
 A Very Merry Christmas
 Little Parts (2009)
 Sweet and Blue (2016)

Collaborations
 6 by 5 by Upper Structure (2004)

Singles
 "Jump Up, Super Star!" – Super Mario Odyssey (2017)
 "Break Free (Lead the Way)" – Super Mario Odyssey (2017)

References

External links
 
 
 

20th-century American actresses
20th-century American pianists
20th-century American singers
20th-century American women singers
21st-century American actresses
21st-century American pianists
21st-century American singers
21st-century American women singers
American women jazz singers
American jazz pianists
American jazz singers
American video game actresses
American voice actresses
American women pianists
Concord Records artists
Living people
Modal jazz pianists
Women jazz pianists
Year of birth missing (living people)